The Battle of Chaldiran took place on 23 August 1514 and ended with a decisive victory for the Ottoman Empire over the Safavid Empire. As a result, the Ottomans annexed Eastern Anatolia and northern Iraq from Safavid Iran. It marked the first Ottoman expansion into Eastern Anatolia (Western Armenia), and the halt of the Safavid expansion to the west. The Chaldiran battle was just the beginning of 41 years of destructive war, which only ended in 1555 with the Treaty of Amasya. Though Mesopotamia and Eastern Anatolia (Western Armenia) were eventually reconquered by the Safavids under the reign of Shah Abbas the Great (r. 1588–1629), they would be permanently ceded to the Ottomans by the 1639 Treaty of Zuhab.

At Chaldiran, the Ottomans had a larger, better equipped army numbering 60,000 to 100,000 as well as many heavy artillery pieces, while the Safavid army numbered some 40,000 to 80,000 and did not have artillery at its disposal. Ismail I, the leader of the Safavids, was wounded and almost captured during the battle. His wives were captured by the Ottoman leader Selim I, with at least one married off to one of Selim's statesmen. Ismail retired to his palace and withdrew from government administration after this defeat and never again participated in a military campaign. After their victory, Ottoman forces marched deeper into Persia, briefly occupying the Safavid capital, Tabriz, and thoroughly looting the Persian imperial treasury.

The battle is one of major historical importance because it not only negated the idea that the Murshid of the Shia-Qizilbash was infallible, but also led Kurdish chiefs to assert their authority and switch their allegiance from the Safavids to the Ottomans.

Background 
Selim had previously fought against the Safavids multiple times. In 1505 he defeated a Safavid army led by Shah Ismail's brother, he routed the Safavids, pursued them and massacred many. He defeated the Safavids again during the Battle of Erzincan in 1507, after Shah Ismail marched through Ottoman lands to attack the Dulkadirids, Selim attacked Erzincan and defeated a Safavid army that was sent against him by Shah Ismail. He fought against the Safavids once more in the 1510 Campaign of Trabzon during which he defeated Shah Ismail's brother.

After Selim I's successful struggle against his brothers for the throne of the Ottoman Empire, he was free to turn his attention to the internal unrest he believed was stirred up by the Shia Qizilbash, who had sided with other members of the Dynasty against him and had been semi-officially supported by Bayezid II. Selim now feared that they would incite the population against his rule in favor of Shah Isma'il leader of the Shia Safavids, believed by some of his supporters to be descended from the Prophet. Selim secured a jurist opinion that described Isma'il and the Qizilbash as "unbelievers and heretics" enabling him to undertake extreme measures on his way eastward to pacify the country. Selim accused Ismail of departing from the faith:

Before Selim started his campaign, he ordered for the execution of some 40,000 Qizilbash of Anatolia, "as punishment for their rebellious behavior". He then also tried to block the import of Iranian silk into his realm, a measure which met "with some success".

The declaration of war by Selim I, was sent in the form of a letter:

When Selim started his march east, the Safavids were invaded in the east by the Uzbeks. The Uzbek state had been recently brought to prominence by Muhammad Shaybani, who had fallen in battle against Isma'il only a few years before. Attempting to avoid having to fight a war on two fronts, Isma'il employed a scorched earth policy against Selim in the west.

Selim's army was discontented by the difficulty in supplying the army in light of Isma'il's scorched earth campaign, the extremely rough terrain of the Armenian Highland, and the fact that they were marching against Muslims. The Janissaries even fired their muskets at the Sultan's tent in protest at one point. When Selim learned of the Safavid army forming at Chaldiran he quickly moved to engage Isma'il, in part to stifle the discontent of his army.

Battle
The Ottomans deployed heavy artillery and thousands of Janissaries equipped with gunpowder weapons behind a barrier of carts. The Safavids, who did not have artillery at their disposal at Chaldiran, used cavalry to engage the Ottoman forces. The Safavids attacked the Ottoman wings in an effort to avoid the Ottoman artillery positioned at the center.  However, the Ottoman artillery was highly maneuverable and the Safavids suffered disastrous losses. The advanced Ottoman weaponry (cannons and muskets wielded by janissaries) was the deciding factor of the battle as the Safavid forces, who only had traditional weaponry, were decimated.  The Safavids also suffered from poor planning and ill-disciplined troops unlike the Ottomans.

Aftermath

Following their victory the Ottomans captured the Safavid capital city of Tabriz on 7 September, which they first pillaged and then evacuated. That week's Friday sermon in mosques throughout the city was delivered in Selim's name. Selim was however unable to press on after Tabriz due to the discontent amongst the Janissaries. The Ottoman Empire successfully annexed Eastern Anatolia (encompassing Western Armenia) and northern Mesopotamia from the Safavids. These areas changed hands several times over the following decades however; the Ottoman hold would not be set until the 1555 Peace of Amasya following the Ottoman-Safavid War (1532–1555). Effective governmental rule and eyalets would not be established over these regions until the 1639 Treaty of Zuhab.

After two of his wives and entire harem were captured by Selim Ismail was heartbroken and resorted to drinking alcohol. His aura of invincibility shattered, Ismail ceased participating in government and military affairs, due to what seems to have been the collapse of his confidence.

Selim married one of Ismail's wives to an Ottoman judge. Ismail sent four envoys, gifts, and in contrast to their previous exchanges, words of praise to Selim in order to help retrieve her. Instead of giving his wife back, Selim cut the messengers' noses off and sent them back empty handed.

After the defeat at Chaldiran, however, the Safavids made drastic domestic changes. From then on, firearms were made an integral part of the Persian armies and Ismail's son, Tahmasp I, deployed cannons in subsequent battles.

During the retreat of the Ottoman troops, they were intensively harassed by Georgian light cavalry of the Safavid army, deep into the Ottoman realm.

The Mamluk Sultanate refused to send messengers to congratulate Selim after the battle and prohibited celebrating the Ottoman military victory. In contrast, the Ottoman conquest of Constantinople led to days of festivities in the Mamluk capital, Cairo.

After the victorious battle of Chaldiran, Selim I next threw his forces southward to fight the Mamluk Sultanate in the Ottoman–Mamluk War (1516–1517).

Battlefield 

The site of the battle is near Chala Ashaqi village, around 6 km west of the town of Siyah Cheshmeh, south of Maku, north of Qareh Ziyaeddin. A large brick dome was built at the battlefield site in 2003 along with a statue of Seyid Sadraddin, one of the main Safavid commanders.

Quotes 
After the battle, Selim believed Ismail I was:

Mirza Muhammad Haidar Dughlat:

See also

 Shia–Sunni relations
 Ottoman–Safavid relations
 Sipahi

References

Sources

 Yves Bomati and Houchang Nahavandi,Shah Abbas, Emperor of Persia,1587–1629, 2017, ed. Ketab Corporation, Los Angeles, English translation by Azizeh Azodi.

Further reading
 
 
 
 
 
 
 

Ottoman–Persian Wars
1514 in Asia
1514 in the Ottoman Empire
16th century in Iran
Battles involving the Ottoman Empire
Battles involving Safavid Iran
Conflicts in 1514
History of West Azerbaijan Province
History of Tabriz
History of East Azerbaijan Province
Shia–Sunni sectarian violence
Western Armenia
Early Modern history of Iraq